The Green Party of the United States (GPUS) is a federation of Green state political parties in the United States. The party promotes green politics, specifically environmentalism; nonviolence; social justice; participatory democracy, grassroots democracy; anti-war; anti-racism; libertarian socialism and eco-socialism. On the political spectrum, the party is generally seen as left-wing.

The GPUS was founded in 2001 as the Association of State Green Parties (ASGP) split from the Greens/Green Party USA (G/GPUSA). After its founding, the GPUS soon became the primary national green organization in the country, surpassing the G/GPUSA, which was formed in 1991 out of the Green Committees of Correspondence (CoC), a collection of local green groups active since the year 1984. The ASGP, which formed in 1996, had increasingly distanced itself from the G/GPUSA in the late 1990s. John Rensenbrink and Howie Hawkins were co-founders of the Green Party.

The Greens gained widespread public attention during the 2000 presidential election, when the ticket composed of Ralph Nader and Winona LaDuke won 2.7% of the popular vote. Nader was accused by Democrats of spoiling the election for Al Gore. Nader maintains that he was not a spoiler in the 2000 election.  it is the fourth-largest political party in the United States by voter registration, behind the Libertarian Party.

History

Early years 

The political movement that began in 1985 as the decentralized Committees of Correspondence evolved into a more centralized structure by 1990, opening a national clearinghouse and forming governing bodies, bylaws and a platform as the Green Committees of Correspondence (GCoC) and by 1990 simply The Greens. The organization conducted grassroots organizing efforts, educational activities and electoral campaigns.

Internal divisions arose between members who saw electoral politics as ultimately corrupting and supported the notion of an "anti-party party" formed by Petra Kelly and other leaders of the Greens in Germany vs. those who saw electoral strategies as a crucial engine of social change. A struggle for the direction of the organization culminated in a "compromise agreement", ratified in 1990 at the Greens National Congress in Elkins, West Virginia and in which both strategies would be accommodated within the same 527 political organization renamed the Greens/Green Party USA (G/GPUSA). It was recognized by the FEC as a national political party in 1991.

The compromise agreement subsequently collapsed and two Green party organizations co-existed in the United States until 2019 when the Greens/Green Party USA was dissolved. The Green Politics Network was organized in 1990 and the National Association of Statewide Green Parties formed by 1994. Divisions between those pressing to break onto the national political stage and those aiming to grow roots at the local level continued to widen during the 1990s. The Association of State Green Parties (ASGP) encouraged and backed Nader's presidential runs in 1996 and 2000. By 2001, the push to separate electoral activity from the G/GPUSA issue-based organizing led to the Boston Proposal and the subsequent rise of the Green Party of the United States.  The G/GPUSA lost most of its affiliates in the next few months and dropped its FEC national party status in the year 2005.

Ideology

Values

The Green Party of the United States follows the ideals of green politics, which are based on the Four Pillars, namely: 
 Ecological wisdom,
 Social justice,
 Grassroots democracy, and
 Nonviolence.

The Ten Key Values, which expand upon the Four Pillars, are as follows:
 Grassroots democracy,
 Social justice and equal opportunity,
 Ecological wisdom,
 Nonviolence,
 Decentralization,
 Community-based economics,
 Feminism and gender equality,
 Respect for diversity,
 Personal and global responsibility, and
 Future focus and sustainability.

The Green Party doesn't accept donations from corporations, political action committees (PACs), 527(c) organizations or soft money. The party's platforms and rhetoric harshly criticize corporate influence and control over government, media, and society at large.

Eco-socialism

In 2016, the Green Party passed a motion in favor of rejecting both capitalism and state socialism, supporting instead an "alternative economic system based on ecology and decentralization of power".<ref name="auto1">{{cite web|website=gp.org|title=A. Ecological Economics. gp.org: IV. Economic Justice & Sustainability|accessdate=May 21, 2021 |url=https://www.gp.org/economic_justice_and_sustainability#ecosoc}}</ref> The motion states the change that the party says could be described as promoting "ecological socialism", "communalism", or perhaps the "cooperative commonwealth". The Green Party rejection of both state socialism and capitalism and their promotion of communalism which was created by libertarian socialist Murray Bookchin places the Green Party into the ideology of libertarian socialism. The eco-socialist economy the Green Party of the United States wants to create is similar to the market socialist mutualist economics of Proudhon which consists of a large sector of democratically controlled public enterprises, a large sector of cooperative enterprises, and a smaller sector of small businesses and self-employed.Proudhon, Pierre-Joseph. General Idea of the Revolution in the Nineteenth Century. New York: Cosimo, Inc. 2007. pp 218-219. Consumer goods and services would be sold to consumers in the market by cooperatives, public enterprises, and small businesses. Services that would be for free include health care, education, child care, and urban mass transit. Goods and services that would be available at low cost would include public housing, power, broadband, and water. The party will also create cooperative banks offering low interest somewhat similar to Proudhon's Mutualist banks. Howie Hawkins who was nominated by the Green Party to run for president of the United States identifies as a libertarian socialist.

 Political positions 
 Economic issues and social issues 
 Healthcare 
The Green Party supports the implementation of a single-payer healthcare system and the abolition of private health insurance in the United States. They have also called for contraception and abortion procedures to be available on demand. The Green Party has called for the repeal of the Hyde Amendment, an act that prohibits the use of federal taxpayer funds for abortions, unless in the cases of rape, incest, or to save the life of the mother.

 Education 
The Green Party calls for providing tuition-free college at public universities and vocational schools, increasing funding for after-school and daycare programs, cancelling all student loan debt, and repealing the No Child Left Behind Act. They are strongly against the dissolution of public schools and the privatization of education.

 Green New Deal 
In 2006, the Green Party developed a Green New Deal that would ultimately serve as a transitional plan to a 100% clean, renewable energy including solar and wind energy by 2030 utilizing a carbon tax, jobs guarantee, tuition-free college, single-payer healthcare and a focus on using public programs.

Howie Hawkins focused his gubernatorial campaign on the Green New Deal, which was the first time the policy was introduced.  Jill Stein also developed her presidential campaign based on the Green New Deal. 

 Criminal justice 
The Green Party favors the abolition of the death penalty, repeal of three-strikes laws, banning of private prisons, legalization of marijuana, and decriminalization of other drugs.

 Racial justice 
The Green Party advocates for "complete and full" reparations to the African American community, as well the removal of the Confederate flag from all government buildings.

 LGBT+ rights 
The party supports same-sex marriage, the right of access to medical and surgical treatment for transgender and gender-nonconforming people, and withdrawing foreign aid to countries with poor LGBT+ rights records.

 Foreign policy 
The Green Party calls on the United States to join the International Criminal Court, and sign the Comprehensive Nuclear-Test-Ban Treaty and Non-Proliferation Treaty. Additionally, it supports cutting the defense budget in half, as well as prohibiting all arms sales to foreign countries.

 Iran 
The Green Party supports the 2015 Iran nuclear deal to decrease sanctions while limiting Iran's capacity to make nuclear weapons.

 Israel/Palestine 
The Green Party advocates for the Palestinian right of return and cutting all U.S. aid to Israel. It has also expressed support for the Boycott, Divestment and Sanctions (BDS) movement. The Green Party supports "...the creation of one secular, democratic state for Palestinians and Israelis on the land between the Mediterranean Sea and the River Jordan as the national home of both peoples, with Jerusalem as its capital."

 Structure and composition 
 Committees 
The Green Party has two national committees recognized by the Federal Election Commission (FEC):
 The Green National Committee (GNC)
 The Green Senatorial Campaign Committee (GSCC)
 Green National Committee 

The GNC is composed of delegates elected by affiliated state parties. The state parties also appoint delegates to serve on the various standing committees of the GNC. The National Committee elects a steering committee of seven co-chairs, a secretary and a treasurer to oversee daily operations. The National Committee performs most of its business online, but it also holds an annual national meeting to conduct business in person.

 Caucuses 
Five Identity Caucuses have achieved representation on the GNC:
 Black Caucus
 Latino Caucus
 Lavender Greens Caucus (LGBTQIA+)
 National Women's Caucus
 Young Ecosocialists

Other caucuses have worked toward formal recognition by the GNC:
 Disability Caucus
 Labor Caucus
 Indigenous Caucus
 Elder Caucus

 Geographic distribution 
The Green Party has its strongest popular support on the Pacific Coast, Upper Great Lakes, and Northeast, as reflected in the geographical distribution of Green candidates elected. , Californians have elected 55 of the 226 office-holding Greens nationwide. Other states with high numbers of Green elected officials include Pennsylvania (31), Wisconsin (23), Massachusetts (18) and Maine (17). Maine has the highest per capita number of Green elected officials in the country and the largest Green registration percentage with more than 29,273 Greens comprising 2.95% of the electorate . Madison, Wisconsin is the city with the most Green elected officials (8), followed by Portland, Maine (7).

The 2016 presidential campaign of Jill Stein got substantive support from counties and precincts with a high percentage of Native American population. For instance, in Sioux County (North Dakota, 84,1% Native American), Stein gained her best county-wide result: 10.4% of the votes. In Rolette County (also North Dakota, 77% Native American), she got 4.7% of the votes. Other majority Native American counties where Stein did above state average are Menominee (WI), Roosevelt (MT) and several precincts in Alaska.

At its peak in 2004, the Green Party had 319,000 registered members in states allowing party registration and tens of thousands of members and contributors in the rest of the country. , this has dropped to 251,000. One challenge that the Green Party (as well as other third parties) faces is the difficulty of overcoming ballot access laws in many states, yet the Green Party has active state parties in all but a few states.

 Officeholders 

, 143 officeholders in the United States were affiliated with the Green Party, the majority of them in California, several in Illinois, Connecticut, Maine, Massachusetts, Oregon, Pennsylvania, and Wisconsin, with five or fewer in ten other states. These included one mayor and one deputy mayor and fourteen county or city commissioners (or equivalent). The remainder were members of school boards, clerks and other local administrative bodies and positions.

Several Green Party members have been elected to state-level office, though not always as affiliates of the party. John Eder was elected to the Maine House of Representatives, re-elected in 2004, but defeated in 2006. Audie Bock was elected to the California State Assembly in 1999, but switched her registration to independent seven months later running as such in the 2000 election. Richard Carroll was elected to the Arkansas House of Representatives in 2008, but switched parties to become a Democrat five months after his election. Fred Smith was elected to the Arkansas House of Representatives in 2012, but re-registered as a Democrat in 2014. In 2010, former Green Party leader Ben Chipman was elected to the Maine House of Representatives as an unenrolled candidate and was re-elected in 2012 and 2014. He has since registered as a Democrat, and is serving in the Maine Senate.

Gayle McLaughlin was twice elected mayor of Richmond, California, defeating two Democrats in 2006 and then reelected in 2010; and elected to City Council in 2014 after completing her second term as mayor. With a population of over 100,000 people, it was the largest American city with a Green mayor. Fairfax, California; Arcata, California; Sebastopol, California; and New Paltz, New York are the only towns in the United States to have had a Green Party majority in their town councils. Twin Ridges Elementary in Nevada County, California held the first Green Party majority school board in the United States.

On September 21, 2017, Ralph Chapman, a member of the Maine House of Representatives, switched his party registration from unaffiliated to Green, providing the Green Party with their first state-level representative since 2014. Henry John Bear became a member of the Green Party in the same year as Chapman, giving the Maine Green Independent Party and GPUS its second currently-serving state representative, though Bear is a nonvoting tribal member of the Maine House of Representatives.

Though several Green congressional candidates have topped 20%, no nominee of the Green Party has been elected to office in the federal government.  In 2016, Mark Salazar set a new record for a Green Party nominee for Congress. Running in the Arizona 8th district against incumbent Republican Congressman Trent Franks, Salazar received 93,954 votes or 31.43%.

Legislative caucuses
With exception to state legislatures and major city councils, all other legislative bodies included in the following chronological table had/have more than two affiliated members simultaneously serving in office.

 List of national conventions and annual meetings 
The Green National Convention is scheduled in presidential election years and the Annual National Meeting is scheduled in other years. The Green National Committee conducts business online between these in-person meetings.
 1996 – Los Angeles, California
 2000 – Denver, Colorado
 2001 – Santa Barbara, California
 2002 – Philadelphia, Pennsylvania
 2003 – Washington, D.C.
 2004 – Milwaukee, Wisconsin
 2005 – Tulsa, Oklahoma
 2006 – Tucson, Arizona
 2007 – Reading, Pennsylvania
 2008 – Chicago, Illinois
 2009 – Durham, North Carolina
 2010 – Detroit, Michigan
 2011 – Alfred, New York
 2012 – Baltimore, Maryland
 2013 – Iowa City, Iowa
 2014 – Saint Paul, Minnesota
 2015 – St. Louis, Missouri
 2016 – Houston, Texas
 2017 – Newark, New Jersey
 2018 – Salt Lake City, Utah
 2019 – Salem, Massachusetts
 2020 – Virtual Online (originally planned for Detroit, Michigan prior to COVID-19 pandemic)''

Presidential ballot access

Electoral results

Presidential elections

Congress

House of Representatives

Senate

Best results in major races

Fundraising and position on Super PACs 
In the early decades of Green organizing in the United States, the prevailing American system of money-dominated elections was universally rejected by Greens, so that some Greens were reluctant to have Greens participate in the election system at all because they deemed the campaign finance system inherently corrupt. Other Greens felt strongly that the Green Party should develop in the electoral arena and many of these Greens felt that adopting an alternative model of campaign finance, emphasizing self-imposed contribution limits, would present a wholesome and attractive contrast to the odious campaign finance practices of the money-dominated major parties.

Over the years, some state Green parties have come to place less emphasis on the principle of self-imposed limits than they did in the past. Nevertheless, it is safe to say that Green Party fundraising (for candidates' campaigns and for the party itself) still tends to rely on relatively small contributions and that Greens generally decry not only the rise of the Super PACs, but also the big-money system, which some Greens criticize as plutocracy.

Some Greens feel that the Green Party's position should be simply to follow the laws and regulations of campaign finance. Other Greens argue that it would injure the Green Party not to practice a principled stand against the anti-democratic influence of money in the political process. Candidates for office, like Jill Stein, the 2012 and 2016 Green Party nominee for the President of the United States, typically rely on smaller donations to fund their campaigns.

State and territorial parties 

The following is a list of accredited state parties which comprise the Green Party of the United States.

 Green Party of Alaska
 Disaffiliated since January 12, 2021 due to nominating Jesse Ventura as its presidential candidate for the 2020 United States presidential election.
 Arizona Green Party
 Green Party of Arkansas
 Green Party of California
 Green Party of Colorado
 Connecticut Green Party
 Green Party of Delaware
 D.C. Statehood Green Party
 Green Party of Florida
 Green Party of Georgia
Deaccredited on July 26, 2021, due to transphobic amendments passed in its party platform.
 Green Party of Montana
 Green Party of Hawaii
 Idaho Green Party
 Illinois Green Party
 Indiana Green Party
 Iowa Green Party
 Kansas Green Party
 Kentucky Green Party
 Green Party of Louisiana
 Maine Green Independent Party
 Maryland Green Party
 Green-Rainbow Party (Massachusetts)
 Green Party of Michigan
 Green Party of Minnesota
 Green Party of Mississippi
 Green Party of New York
 Nebraska Green Party
 Green Party of New Jersey
 North Carolina Green Party
 Green Party of Ohio
 Green Party of Oklahoma
 Pacific Green Party (Oregon)
 Green Party of Pennsylvania
 Green Party of Rhode Island
Disaffiliated since December 29, 2020 due to endorsing Joe Biden for president during the 2020 United States presidential election.
 South Carolina Green Party
 Green Party of Texas
 Green Party of Utah
 Vermont Green Party
 Green Party of Virginia
 Green Party of Washington State
  Mountain Party (West Virginia)
 Wisconsin Green Party

See also

 2020 Green Party presidential primaries
 List of state Green Parties in the United States
 List of political parties in the United States
 Movement for a People’s Party
 Progressivism in the United States
 Ellen Brown
 Mike Feinstein
 Paul Glover
 Daniel Hamburg
 Dario Hunter
 Brent McMillan
 Ross Mirkarimi
 
 Dona Spring
 Charlene Spretnak
 Kevin Zeese
 Margaret Flowers

Notes

References

External links 

 
 

 
Political parties in the United States
Political parties established in 2001
Green Party of the United States organizations
Libertarian socialist parties
2001 establishments in the United States